Carlo Croccolo (9 April 1927 – 12 October 2019) was an Italian actor, voice actor, director and screenwriter.

Biography
Born in Naples, Croccolo began his acting career on the radio and he appeared in more than 100 films since 1949. His debut came in the 1949 film The Firemen of Viggiù and he made his first television debut in 1956. He was best known for some of his collaborations with Totò mainly throughout the 1950s and 1960s. Croccolo’s international appearance came from the 1996 film In Love and War directed by Richard Attenborough. He also had an intense theatrical career as he often starred in plays directed by Eduardo De Filippo and Giorgio Strehler.

As a voice actor, Croccolo performed the Italian voice of Oliver Hardy in the 1951-1953 redubs of Laurel and Hardy in which he was paired with Fiorenzo Fiorentini (the Italian voice of Stan Laurel). He returned to dub Hardy in the 1968-1970 redubs, this time, paired with Franco Latini. Since 1957, Croccolo had served as a dubbing artist for Totò in some of his films.

In 1989, Croccolo received the David di Donatello for best supporting actor in the film 'O Re.

Croccolo died in his home in Castel Volturno on 12 October 2019 at the age of 92. His funeral was held in the Church of San Ferdinando and his body was cremated at the request of the family.

Selected filmography

 The Firemen of Viggiù (1949) - Fireman from Piemont
 L'inafferrabile 12 (1950) - Il barbiere
 The Cadets of Gascony (1950) - Soldato Pinozzo
 Totò Tarzan (1950) - Lo sposino
 Toto the Sheik (1950) - Il cameriere
 47 morto che parla (1950) - Gondrano, il cameriere
 Beauties on Bicycles (1951) - Pinozzo
 Il caimano del Piave (1951) - Esposito
 Arrivano i nostri (1951) - Karl, il guardino del circo
 La paura fa 90 (1951) - Pinotto, guardiano in prima
 Stasera sciopero (1951) - Pasquale
 Tizio, Caio, Sempronio (1951)
 Porca miseria (1951) - Carletto Esposito aka Professore Sik-Sik
 Licenza premio (1951) - Pinozzo Molliconi
 Free Escape (1951) - Pinozzo Molliconi
 Ha fatto 13 (1951) - Mario Rossi
 Auguri e figli maschi! (1951) - Toniotto
 Sardinian Vendetta (1952) - Pinuccio Porchiddu
 The Eternal Chain (1952) - Peppino
 Ragazze da marito (1952) - Salvatore
 Primo premio: Mariarosa (1952)
 Non è vero... ma ci credo! (1952) - Alberto Sammaria
 The Daughter of the Regiment (1953)
 Siamo tutti Milanesi (1953)
 The Count of Saint Elmo (1953) - Alberico
 Gran varietà (1954) - Battaglia, il comico 'militare' (episodio 'Cruttica')
 Poverty and Nobility (1954) - Luigino
 Red and Black (1954)
 Di qua, di là del Piave (1954)
 Assi alla ribalta (1954) - Himself
 Altair (1956) - Labbate
 I pinguini ci guardano (1956)
 Totò lascia o raddoppia? (1956) - Camillo
 Cerasella (1959)
 Gentlemen Are Born (1960) - Battista
 My Friend, Dr. Jekyll (1960) - Arguzio
 The Two Rivals (1960) - Carletto
 Fountain of Trevi (1960) - Ali Baba
 Appuntamento a Ischia (1960) - Carletto
 Five Day Lover (1961) - Marius
 Pulcinella, cetrulo di Acerra (1961) - Pulcinella
 Hercules in the Valley of Woe (1961) - Fetonte
 Pesci d'oro e bikini d'argento (1961)
 Mina... fuori la guardia (1961) - Carletto
 Fra' Manisco cerca guai (1961) - Fra Leone
 Jessica (1962) - Beppi Toriello
 The Reluctant Saint (1962) - The Gobbo - the Hunchback
 Gli eroi del doppio gioco (1962) - Secondo Rossi
 Noches de Casablanca (1963)
 Yesterday, Today and Tomorrow (1963) - Auctioneer (segment "Adelina")
 The Four Musketeers (1963)
 Panic Button (1964) - Guido
 I marziani hanno 12 mani (1964) - X2
 Freddy in the Wild West (1964) - Sheriff Mickey Stanton
 The Yellow Rolls-Royce (1964) - Michele, Mrs. Millett's chauffeur
 Non son degno di te (1965) - Pinosso Morricone
 Me, Me, Me... and the Others (1966) - JokingTraveller
 Dio, come ti amo! (1966) - Gennaro
 After the Fox (1966) - Café Owner
 How I Learned to Love Women (1966) - Direttore autosalone
 Perdono (1966) - Policeman
 Testa di rapa (1966) - Il Brigante Salomone
 The Biggest Bundle of Them All (1968) - Franco
 Danger: Diabolik (1968) - Lorry Driver
 Gunman of One Hundred Crosses (1971) - Slim - Stuttering Henchman
 Black Killer (1971) - Fred, Deputy Sheriff
 Le seminariste (1976) - San Giulivo
 Goodnight, Ladies and Gentlemen (1976) - Tax Inspector (uncredited)
 Passi furtivi in una notte boia (1976) - Ragionier Dolci
 Beach House (1977) - Carlo
 Where's Picone? (1984) - Barone Armato
 Massimamente folle (1985)
 Il camorrista (1986)
 ’O Re (1987) - Rafele
 Via Lattea... la prima a destra (1989)
 The Miser (1990) - Mastro Simone
 In the Name of the Sovereign People (1990) - Carlo Bonaparte
 In camera mia (1992)
 Camerieri (1995) - Salvatore Azzaro
 Men Men Men (1995) - Peppino
 Il cielo è sempre più blu (1996)
 Giovani e belli (1996) - Bonafoni
 In Love and War (1996) - Town Mayor
 A Cold, Cold Winter (1996) - Dr Crocchia
 Commercial Break (1997) - Ciro Esposito
 Three Men and a Leg (1997) - Cecconi, father in law
 Li chiamarono... briganti! (1999) - Vincenzo, il calzolaio
 La vita, per un'altra volta (1999) - Cesari
 Terra bruciata (1999) - Maresciallo
 Ogni lasciato è perso (2001) - Primario
 Il commesso viaggiatore (2001)
 Amore con la S maiuscola (2002) - Pasquale
 Il quaderno della spesa (2003) - Cavalier Angelo Marconi
 Cose da pazzi (2005) - Nonno
 Italian Dream (2007)

References

External links

1927 births
2019 deaths
Male actors from Naples
Italian male film actors
Italian male voice actors
Italian male stage actors
Italian male television actors
Italian male screenwriters
Italian film directors
David di Donatello winners
Ciak d'oro winners
20th-century Italian male actors
Film people from Naples